The de Havilland Ghost was a British V-8 aero engine that first ran in 1928.

Design and development
Designed by Geoffrey de Havilland the 'Ghost' was developed from the ADC Cirrus aero engine by using two banks of four cylinders. This appeared at first to be a retrograde step as the Cirrus was itself developed from the Renault 80 hp V8 engine however with the improved Cirrus cylinders the Ghost developed over twice the power of the French engine for a lower weight. Another difference from the Renault was the use of a propeller reduction gear, the Ghost's sole known aircraft application was the prototype de Havilland Hawk Moth high-wing cabin monoplane.

Specifications (Ghost)

See also

References

Notes

Bibliography

 Lumsden, Alec. British Piston Engines and their Aircraft. Marlborough, Wiltshire: Airlife Publishing, 2003. .

External links
Image of the de Havilland Ghost installed in a Hawk Moth - Flight, February 1929

Ghost (V8)
1920s aircraft piston engines